Saida Galimova (born 27 March 1989) is an Uzbekistani footballer who plays as a midfielder for Women's Championship club Bunyodkor and the Uzbekistan women's national team.

International career
Galimova capped for Uzbekistan at senior level during the 2020 AFC Women's Olympic Qualifying Tournament.

International goals

See also
List of Uzbekistan women's international footballers

References 

1989 births
Living people
Uzbekistani women's footballers
Uzbekistan women's international footballers
Women's association football midfielders
People from Andijan
Uzbekistani women's futsal players
20th-century Uzbekistani women
21st-century Uzbekistani women